Robert Warren is an Australian bass guitarist who has played in various bands since 1985 in both Brisbane and Sydney, including Died Pretty (1991–2002).

Biography
Robert Warren played bass guitar in various Australian bands in both Brisbane and Sydney from 1985 to the present, including chronologically, The Closest Thing, Dementia 13, The Egyptians, Sanity Assassins, The Reptile House, Mona Lisa Overdrive, Died Pretty (1991–2002), Lodestar, Hissy Fit, Mr Blonde and Libero Vox.

Most recently, Warren has performed with The Exploding Boys who act as the backing band for tribute shows featuring various singers.

Warren's recorded material is notable for driving, "tribal-sounding" bass lines, and bass lines that provided the melody line in a song by using chord variations, most often against a pedal note. The prominent use of the bass guitar to provide such melodic interest was a feature of many Died Pretty recordings and can be traced throughout the band's history. Warren has appeared in eight Died Pretty videos and press interviews in various media outlets.

Discography 
The Closest Thing

Dementia 13

The Egyptians

Sanity Assassins

The Reptile House

Mona Lisa Overdrive

Died Pretty (1991–2002)
 see full discography for Died Pretty
Lodestar

Hissy Fit

Mr Blonde
 Disorder (EP)
 It's the only thing left to do in this world (single)
 Imogen (single)

 Bipolar (album)

 Blow up (album)

Hawce

Libero Vox

HEAD

Dr. Bombay

References

General
  Note: Archived [on-line] copy has limited functionality.
  Note: [on-line] version established at White Room Electronic Publishing Pty Ltd in 2007 and was expanded from the 2002 edition.

Specific

Year of birth missing (living people)
Living people
Australian musicians
Griffith University alumni